Join the Army is the second studio album by American crossover thrash band Suicidal Tendencies. It was released in April 1987, and is one of the most well known albums for crossing over the genres of punk and thrash metal, known as crossover thrash, a genre that Suicidal Tendencies have been credited for creating. Join the Army is arguably one of Suicidal Tendencies' most popular efforts, although it only reached No. 100 on the Billboard 200 chart. This was their first album with guitarist Rocky George and drummer R.J. Herrera, and their last recording with bassist Louiche Mayorga (although he did co-write songs on their next album How Will I Laugh Tomorrow When I Can't Even Smile Today). This is also the last album to feature the band playing hardcore punk before an extended period with a more thrash metal focus (on some more recent albums, hardcore punk is again part of the mix).

Musical style
Mike Muir used vastly different vocal techniques and range compared to their debut album (sometimes sounding similar to Lemmy from Motörhead). Original guitarist Grant Estes had been replaced by Jon Nelson in 1984, who was then soon replaced by Rocky George, who influenced the change of the band's sound into the thrash direction. Original drummer Amery Smith was replaced by R.J. Herrera, who used the particularly metal drum feature of double kick.

Reception and legacy

Reviews for Join the Army have been mostly positive. AllMusic's Eduardo Rivadavia awards the album three stars out of five, and calls it "a transitional album in the transformation of the band's sound from hardcore punk to thrash metal."

Join the Army was also the first Suicidal Tendencies album to enter the Billboard 200; it peaked at No. 100, and remained on the chart for thirteen weeks. "Possessed to Skate" preceded the album's release as a single, which also had a music video created for it. The video featured old school skateboarding tricks, and as such is considered a classic visual period piece of skateboarding. The success of Join the Army garnered 
attention from major labels, including Epic Records, with whom Suicidal Tendencies would eventually sign in 1988.

"War Inside My Head" is featured in the game Guitar Hero: Metallica. "Possessed to Skate" is featured in the game Skate 2. "Suicidal Maniac" was covered by Hatebreed on their 2009 release For the Lions.

Over the years and with the involvement several line-ups, Suicidal Tendencies have recorded new versions of 10 of the 13 songs originally included in Join the Army, including two different new versions of two of those tracks: "War Inside My Head" and "A Little Each Day" (Still Cyco After All These Years); "Join the Army" and "Go Skate! (Possessed to Skate '97)" (Prime Cuts); "Two Wrongs Don't Make a Right" (Year of the Cycos); "Suicidal Maniac", "Possessed to Skate", "The Prisoner", "I Feel Your Pain... And I Survive", "Join the ST Army", "No Name, No Words", and "Born to Be Cyco" (No Mercy Fool!/The Suicidal Family).

Track listing

 "War Inside My Head", "Human Guinea Pig", and "You Got, I Want" were originally written by previous guitarist Jon Nelson. He traded the rights for "War Inside My Head" for a Flying V guitar after he left the band.
 A different version of "War Inside My Head" was played live and existed as early as 1982, but with a different arrangement and lyrics. The song is sometimes labeled as "War Inside Myself" on certain bootleg releases but is a entirely different song that appeared on the 2nd Demo in 1982. 
"Human Guinea Pig" does not appear on vinyl or cassette versions of the album.

Credits
 Mike Muir – lead vocals
 Louiche Mayorga – bass, backing vocals
 Rocky George – guitars, backing vocals
 R.J. Herrera – drums
Recorded and mixed at Record Plant, Los Angeles, California
Produced by Lester Claypool (not to be confused with Les Claypool) and Suicidal Tendencies
Engineered by Lester Claypool
Guitar and vocals recorded at Baby/O/
Album cover by Michael Seiff

Chart positions

Album
Billboard (North America)

References

Suicidal Tendencies albums
1987 albums
Caroline Records albums
Albums recorded at Record Plant (Los Angeles)